Diego Martin is a town and urban commercial center in Trinidad and Tobago

Diego Martin may also refer to:

Diego Martin (region), a Region of Trinidad and Tobago
Diego Martin Highway, a highway in Trinidad and Tobago
Diego Martín (actor) (born 1974), Spanish actor

See also
Diego Martins (disambiguation)